The VTB United League 2009–10 was the first complete season of the VTB United League, which is Eastern Europe's (and the Baltic region's) top-tier level competition for men's professional basketball clubs.

Teams of the 2009–10 season

Group stage

Group A

Game 1

Game 2

Game 3

Game 4

Game 5

Game 6

Group B

Game 1

Game 2

Game 3

Game 4

Game 5

Game 6

Final four
The Final Four took place between January 21 and 22, 2010 in Kaunas, Lithuania at Kaunas Sports Hall, the home court of Žalgiris Kaunas. The following teams qualified:

  CSKA Moscow
  Khimki Moscow Region
  UNICS Kazan
  Žalgiris Kaunas

Semifinals

Third-place playoff

Final

Individual awards

All-Round 1 Team

Andrey Vorontsevich – MVP (CSKA)
Timofey Mozgov (Khimki)
Chris Owens (Donetsk)
Martynas Mažeika (VEF)
Marko Popović (UNICS)

All-Round 2 Team

Marko Popović – MVP (UNICS)
Krešimir Lončar (UNICS)
Victor Khryapa (CSKA)
Robertas Javtokas (Khimki)
Zygimantas Janavicius (Zalgiris)

All-Round 3 Team

Marcus Brown – MVP (Zalgiris)
Artur Drozdov (Donetsk)
Saulius Štombergas (UNICS)
Victor Khryapa (CSKA)
Alex Renfroe (VEF)

All-Round 4 Team

Marcus Brown – MVP (Zalgiris)
Zoran Planinić (CSKA)
Marko Popović (UNICS)
Paulius Jankūnas (Khimki)
Hasan Rizvić (Azovmash)

All-Round 5 Team

Victor Khryapa – MVP (CSKA)
Kelly McCarty (Khimki)
Travis Watson (Zalgiris)
Igor Zamanskiy (UNICS)
Alex Renfroe (VEF)

All-Tournament Team

Martynas Pocius (Zalgiris)
Maciej Lampe (UNICS)
Sasha Kaun (CSKA)
Vitaly Fridzon (Khimki)
Marko Popović (UNICS)

MVPs

External links
Official Website 
Official Website 

2009–10
2009–10 in European basketball leagues
2009–10 in Russian basketball
2009–10 in Lithuanian basketball
2009–10 in Ukrainian basketball
2009–10 in Latvian basketball
2009–10 in Estonian basketball